The Bulgaria women's national basketball team represents Bulgaria in international women's basketball, and is controlled by the Bulgarian Basketball Federation. Their achievements range from winning the 1958 EuroBasket Women's Championship, and the Balkan Championship in 1960. Other successes came with the team finishing as runners-up at the 1980 Summer Olympics and the 1959 FIBA Women's World Cup. The national team has several members playing their professional basketball careers in the United States WNBA.

Competitive record

Olympic Games

World Cup

EuroBasket

Friendship Games

Balkan Championship

Summer Universiade

References

External links
Official website 
Bulgaria at FIBA site
Bulgaria National Team – Women at Eurobasket.com

 

Women's national basketball teams
Women's national sports teams of Bulgaria